Pristurus samhaensis is a species of lizard in the Sphaerodactylidae family found on Samhah and Darsah islands.

References

Pristurus
Reptiles described in 1999